Danny Everett (born November 1, 1966) is an American former track and field athlete who competed in sprinting events, specializing in the 400 metres. He won bronze medals in the 400m at the 1988 Olympic Games and at the 1991 World Championships, and won gold medals in the 4 × 400 m relay at the 1987 World Championships and the 1988 Olympic Games. His 400m best of 43.81 seconds when winning the 1992 US Olympic trials, moved him to second on the world all-time list and still ranks him 13th on the world all-time list (as of 2022).

Early life
Everett was born in Van Alstyne, Texas, then moved to South Central Los Angeles as a child. Everett did not start running track until tenth grade at Fairfax High School, when the high school track coach encouraged him to try out for the team. In two short years, Everett cultivated his natural athletic talent and as a senior placed second in the 400 meters at the California State High School Track & Field championships.

After graduating from Fairfax, Danny attended UCLA. As a Bruin, Everett's track achievements included: NCAA champion in 400 meters and 1600 meter relay, three-time NCAA All-American, and two-time Pac-10 400 meter and 1600 meter relay champion. Everett was inducted into the UCLA Athletic Hall of Fame in 2003.

Olympic teams
From 1987 to 1992, Everett qualified for the U.S. Olympic team where he won gold and bronze medals in the 1600 meter relay and 400 meters in the 1988 Olympic Games in Seoul, South Korea. Everett also won gold, silver and bronze medals at the World Championships in Rome, Italy in 1987 and in Tokyo, Japan in 1991. During his career, Everett set five world records in the 300 meters, 400 meters, 1600 meter relay and 4 x 200 meter. In 1992, Everett qualified for the U.S. Olympic Team, running the fastest Olympic qualifying time in U.S. history at 43.81 and at that time the second fastest time in history. Everett suffered a foot injury at the 1992 Olympic Games in Barcelona, Spain.

Personal life

Everett and his wife Tiarzha Taylor live in Upper Ojai, California with their three children. He coaches track & field for the Ojai Roadrunners in Ojai. Everett has served as consultant for local athletic programs, and co-founded Precious Medals, a sports merchandising firm. Everett later attended the Los Angeles Culinary Institute and launched SoulFête, a culinary event series.

References

1966 births
Living people
American male sprinters
Athletes (track and field) at the 1988 Summer Olympics
Athletes (track and field) at the 1992 Summer Olympics
Olympic gold medalists for the United States in track and field
Olympic bronze medalists for the United States in track and field
University of California, Los Angeles alumni
UCLA Bruins men's track and field athletes
World Athletics Championships medalists
Track and field athletes from California
Medalists at the 1988 Summer Olympics
Goodwill Games medalists in athletics
World Athletics Championships winners
Competitors at the 1986 Goodwill Games
Competitors at the 1990 Goodwill Games